Duplin Winery is North Carolina's oldest operating winery, established in 1975.  It is located in Duplin County, North Carolina, producing approximately 450,000 cases per year and is known primarily for muscadine wines.

References

External links

Buildings and structures in Duplin County, North Carolina
Wineries in North Carolina
Tourist attractions in Duplin County, North Carolina